Rome railway station or Rome station could refer to:
 Roma Termini railway station, the primary station in Rome, Italy
 Rome station (New York) in Rome, New York
 Rome (Paris Métro), on the Paris Métro

See also 
 :Category:Railway stations in Rome